Ian Maher (born 5 November 1985 in Dublin) is an Irish footballer.

Maher is a midfielder who joined St. Pats from schoolboy side Cherry Orchard F.C. before the start of the 2004 season.  After a series of impressive displays for the club's Under 21 side (which he captained), Maher was called up to the first team in 2005.  He had spells with Shamrock Rovers and Kildare County on loan for the 2006 season to gain experience in the first division, but rejoined St. Pats at the end of the season. He rejoined Cherry Orchard in January 2007 helping them to the LSL title.

His performances for Joe Somerville's side attracted the attention of Leonidas who signed him in September 2007. On his return from the Netherlands he joined up with Monaghan United at the start of the 2008 season. Ian is now manager of Leinster senior league side Booth Road Celtic taking the reins in the summer of 2016.

External links
Ian Maher on stpatsfc.com
Ian Maher on playerhistory.com

Association footballers from County Dublin
Republic of Ireland association footballers
Association football defenders
Shamrock Rovers F.C. players
St Patrick's Athletic F.C. players
Kildare County F.C. players
League of Ireland players
1985 births
Living people
Cherry Orchard F.C. players
Monaghan United F.C. players